Saint Aquilinus (ca. 620–695) was a Frankish bishop and hermit.  Born in Bayeux, he had been a warrior in the service of Clovis II and married in 660 at Chartres.  He moved to Évreux with his wife, and both cared for the poor and sick in this town.  In 670, he was named bishop of the city, but Aquilinus preferred to live as a hermit.  His feast day is 19 October.

See also

Conrad of Piacenza, beatified married hermit
Gummarus, married hermit saint
Poustinia

References

695 deaths
Bishops of Évreux
French hermits
7th-century Frankish saints
Year of birth unknown
Married Roman Catholic bishops